Monika Ludwig (born 1966 in Cologne) is an Austrian mathematician, University Professor of Convex and Discrete Geometry at the Vienna University of Technology.

Academic career
Ludwig earned a Dipl.-Ing. degree from the Vienna University of Technology in 1990, and a doctorate in 1994 under the supervision of Peter M. Gruber. She remained at the same university as an assistant and associate professor from 1994 until 2007, when she moved to the Polytechnic Institute of New York University. She returned to the Vienna University of Technology as a full professor in 2010.

Awards and honors
Ludwig won the Edmund and Rosa Hlawka Prize of the Austrian Academy of Sciences, given to an outstanding Austrian researcher in geometry of numbers or numerical analysis under the age of 30, in 1998. She won the Prize of the Austrian Mathematical Society in 2004.

She became a corresponding member of the Austrian Academy of Sciences in 2011, and a fellow of the American Mathematical Society in 2012. She became a full member of the Austrian Academy of Sciences in 2013.

Notable publications

References

External links

1966 births
Living people
Austrian mathematicians
Women mathematicians
TU Wien alumni
Academic staff of TU Wien
New York University faculty
Fellows of the American Mathematical Society
Members of the Austrian Academy of Sciences